Gutcher is a settlement on the northeast coast of Yell in the Shetland islands. From here, rollon/roll off ferry services to Belmont on Unst and Hamars Ness on Fetlar operate. The settlement has a harbour, and a former post office which, in 2012, reopened as a bed and breakfast. There is a café adjacent to the ferry waiting room (Geoffrey's) that opened in 2019.  

During World War II, the Luftwaffe machine gunned the post office at Gutcher in an attempt to disrupt the communications system.

References

External links

 Overview of Gutcher, Gazetteer for Scotland

Villages in Yell, Shetland